Weltman is a surname. Notable people with the surname include:

Amanda Weltman (born 1979), South African theoretical physicist
Harry Weltman (1933–2014), American basketball executive
Jeff Weltman, American Basketball executive

See also
Wertman